Thomas Edward "Ted" Brown (born February 15, 1957) is a former American college and professional football player who was a running back in the National Football League (NFL) for eight seasons during the late 1970s and 1980s.  Brown played college football for North Carolina State University, where he was recognized as an All-American.  He was a first-round pick in the 1979 NFL Draft, and played professionally for the NFL's Minnesota Vikings. Brown's son, J. T. is a former National Hockey League player.

Early years
Brown was born in High Point, North Carolina. He attended T. Wingate Andrews High School.

College career
By the time Brown graduated from North Carolina State University in 1978, he had set the Atlantic Coast Conference career rushing record with 4,602 yards and the single game rushing record with 251 yards against Penn State in 1977.  He was an All-ACC pick for all four years in college and a consensus All-American in 1978.

College statistics

* Includes bowl games.

In 2013, Brown was inducted into the College Football Hall of Fame.

Professional career

In December 1981, Brown accidentally shot himself while handling a loaded revolver. The injury required surgery to remove bullet and wood fragments from his upper thigh. There was a question of whether he would be able continue his career in football.

Brown was inducted into the North Carolina Sports Hall of Fame in 1995.

Post-retirement
After retiring from football, Brown became a juvenile probation officer in Saint Paul, Minnesota. His son, J. T., played with the Minnesota Wild of the National Hockey League.

References

1957 births
Living people
All-American college football players
American football running backs
College Football Hall of Fame inductees
Minnesota Vikings players
NC State Wolfpack football players
Players of American football from North Carolina
Sportspeople from High Point, North Carolina
People who entered an Alford plea